Enrique Serrano Escobar (born 14 May 1958) is a Mexican politician affiliated with the Institutional Revolutionary Party. From 2013 to 2015 he served as Mayor of Ciudad Juárez. He also has served as a Deputy in the LX Legislature of the Mexican Congress, representing the state of Chihuahua.

Serrano was born in Altar, Sonora but grew up in Ciudad Juárez.

References

1958 births
Living people
21st-century Mexican politicians
Members of the Chamber of Deputies (Mexico)
Municipal presidents of Juárez
Institutional Revolutionary Party politicians
Politicians from Sonora
Politicians from Chihuahua (state)
People from Ciudad Juárez
Autonomous University of Chihuahua alumni
Universidad Autónoma de Ciudad Juárez alumni
Monterrey Institute of Technology and Higher Education alumni